This article shows the rosters of all participating teams at the men's indoor volleyball tournament at the 2012 Summer Olympics in London.

Pool A

The following is the British roster in the men's volleyball tournament of the 2012 Summer Olympics.

Head coach:  Harry Brokking

The following is the Italian roster in the men's volleyball tournament of the 2012 Summer Olympics.

Head coach: Mauro Berruto

The following is the Polish roster in the men's volleyball tournament of the 2012 Summer Olympics.

Head coach:  Andrea Anastasi

The following is the Argentine roster in the men's volleyball tournament of the 2012 Summer Olympics.

Head coach: Javier Weber

The following is the Bulgarian roster in the men's volleyball tournament of the 2012 Summer Olympics.

Head coach: Nayden Naydenov

The following is the Australian roster in the men's volleyball tournament of the 2012 Summer Olympics.

Head coach:  Jon Uriarte

Pool B

The following is the Brazilian roster in the men's volleyball tournament of the 2012 Summer Olympics.

Head coach: Bernardo Rezende

The following is the Russian roster in the men's volleyball tournament of the 2012 Summer Olympics.

Head coach: Vladimir Alekno

The following is the American roster in the men's volleyball tournament of the 2012 Summer Olympics.

Head coach: Alan Knipe

The following is the Serbian roster in the men's volleyball tournament of the 2012 Summer Olympics.

Head coach:  Igor Kolaković

The following is the German roster in the men's volleyball tournament of the 2012 Summer Olympics.

Head coach:  Vital Heynen

The following is the Tunisian roster in the men's volleyball tournament of the 2012 Summer Olympics.

Head coach: Fethi Mkaouer

See also
Volleyball at the 2012 Summer Olympics – Women's team rosters

References

External links
Official website

2012
Men's team rosters
Men's events at the 2012 Summer Olympics